Gilia nevinii is an uncommon species of flowering plant in the phlox family known by the common name Nevin's gilia. It is known only from the Channel Islands of California and Guadalupe Island off Baja California, where it grows in seaside canyons and flats. This is an erect herb with a hairy stem up to about 40 centimeters tall lined with deeply lobed leaves. The glandular inflorescence produces yellow-throated lavender flowers 8 to 14 millimeters wide, each with protruding stamens tipped with blue anthers.

External links
Jepson Manual Treatment - Gilia nevinii
Gilia nevinii - Photo gallery

nevinii
Flora of Baja California
Flora of California
Flora of Mexican Pacific Islands
Natural history of the California chaparral and woodlands
Natural history of the Channel Islands of California
Flora without expected TNC conservation status